The canton of Bordères-sur-l'Échez is an administrative division of the Hautes-Pyrénées department, southwestern France. Its borders were modified at the French canton reorganisation which came into effect in March 2015. Its seat is in Bordères-sur-l'Échez.

It consists of the following communes:
Bazet
Bordères-sur-l'Échez
Bours
Chis
Ibos
Orleix
Oursbelille

References

Cantons of Hautes-Pyrénées